This is a list of notable Odia language writers from Odisha, India from the 8th century onward.

Charyagiti Era of Buddhist poets (7th - 8th Century A.D ) 

 Sarahapada

Age of Sarala Yuga (15th Century A.D)

Sarala Das (1465 ? )

Panchasakha Era (15th - 16th Century A.D) 

Atibadi Jagannath Das (c. 1491-1550)
Achyutananda Das
Balaram Das
Ananta Das
Jasobanta Das

Age of Upendra Bhanja

 Kabi Samrat Upendra Bhanja (C. 1688-1740)
 Kavisurya Baladev Rath (c. 1789 – 1845)

Age of Radhanath

 Fakir Mohan Senapati
 Gangadhar Meher
 Radhanath Ray
 Madhusudan Rao
 Nanda Kishore Bal
 Reba Ray

Post Colonial Age
 Gangadhar Meher
 Sachidananda Routray
 Brajanath Rath
 Binod Chandra Nayak 
Bira kishor Das 
Banchhanidhi Mohanty
Mayadhar Mansingh
Manorama Mohapatra

Poetry
 Brajanath Rath
 Ramakanta Rath
 Sitakanta Mohapatra
 Haraprasad Das
 Pratibha Satpathy

Novelists
Gopinath Mohanty
Surendra Mohanty
Manoj Das
Santanu Kumar Acharya
Pratibha Ray
Gourahari Das
Binapani Mohanty

Women's Writings and Feminism
Sarojini Sahoo
Archana Nayak
Nandini Sahu

Children's literature
Odia children's literature has a long history. Its roots are in Moukhika Sishu Sahitya, which is a part of the Loka Sahitya meant for the children.  As its development started after modern education was implemented, Odia children's literature is divided in two categories, Odia Moukhika children's literature and Odia written children's literature. 
Ramakrushna Nanda
Krutibas Nayak
Adikanda Mahanta

Drama/Plays
Manoranjan Das
Gopal Chhotray

Short Story
Baidyanath Misra
Fakir Mohan Senapati
Surendra Mohanty
Manoj Das
Jagadish Mohanty
Sarojini Sahoo
Gourahari Das
Hussain Rabi Gandhi

Popular science
Binod Kanungo
Gokulananda Mohapatra
Ramesh Chandra Parida
Kamalakanta Jena
Mayadhar Swain

See also 
 Odia Literature
 Odia language
 Odia people
 List of people from Odisha

Notes

External links
 Important Collection of Books and authors of Odisha Collection of Books and Authors of Odisha

 Sahitya Akademi Award winners in Oriya Sahitya Akademi
 www.riocl.org

Writers
Lists of writers by language
Lists of Indian writers
Odia-language writers